Air Marshal Sudarshana Karagoda Pathirana psc, is a senior Sri Lankan Air Force Officer. He is the current Commander of the Sri Lanka Air Force. Born on 30 December 1965, Air Marshal Sudarshana Pathirana is an alumnus of Dharmaraja College, Kandy.

Career 
Having joined the Sri Lanka Air Force as an Officer Cadet on the 2nd of July 1985, he completed his Basic Ground Training at Diyatalawa, securing the award for the Best Cadet of the 14th Officer Cadets Course. Pathirana was among a batch of pilots who were sent to the Pakistan Air Force Academy in Risalpur for advanced flying training, where he won the award for the "Best Allied Flight Cadet" from the PAF. Pathirana was commissioned in the rank of Pilot Officer on 2 January 1987 at the Pakistan Air Force Academy, Risalpur, Pakistan.

Pathirana followed his Junior Command and Staff Course at the Command and Staff and Training Institute, Bangladesh. In 1995, he became the first Sri Lankan pilot to complete the All-Purpose Qualified Flying Instructors Course in India. In 2002, he became the first Sri Lankan Air Force Officer to obtain the master's degree in Operational Art and Science from the Air University United States Air Force, Alabama in US. He pursued his second master's degree after completing master's degree (Defence Studies) in Management from the General Sir John Kotelawala Defence University.

He also served in as the first Defense Attaché at the Sri Lankan Embassy in Russia from 2007 to 2009. During his stint as defense attache in Russia, he obtained a diploma in the field of air field management from the University of Ukraine. He also served as the deputy military liaison officer at the Ministry of Defense for a short stint between 2009 and 2011. In January 2011, he attended the National Defense College gaining ndc qualification. He was also awarded the Master in Philosophy from the University of Chennai in 2012.

Command 
Pathirana later went on to command three Air Bases, which includes a tenure as the Commandant of the Air Force Academy. He was appointed to the Air Force Board of Management in 2017 as the Director Air Operations prior to being appointed as the Commander, he served as the Chief of Staff from 2019 onwards.

Flying
Initially commencing his career in the Sri Lanka Air Force as a Reconnaissance pilot, he subsequently transited to Light Transport flying prior to moving into fast jets as a member of the first batch of pilots to fly supersonic aircraft in Sri Lanka. He commanded No 5 Fighter Squadron and subsequently No 10 Fighter Squadron flying the Kfir C 2 / C 7 extensively. Pathirana is a qualified flying instructor and a flying examiner. In addition to Kfir and F-7 fighters he is qualified in over 10 types of aircraft earning him over 3,500 flying hours. In addition, he holds a Commercial Pilots License and is a Flying Examiner for the Civil Aviation Authority of Sri Lanka.

Awards 

In recognition of his unblemished and distinguished service, Pathirana has been awarded with the “Vishista Seva Vibhushanaya” and the “Uththama Seva Padakkama”. For his contribution during the humanitarian operations, Pathirana has awarded with gallantry medals on 8 occasions. Namely, “Weera Wickrama Vibhushanaya” twice, “Rana Wickrama Padakkama” twice and “Rana Sura Padakkama” on four occasions.

Appointment as the Commander of the Sri Lanka Air Force 
On 2 November 2020, he was appointed as the 18th Commander of the Air Force by President Gotabaya Rajapaksa and was also promoted to the three star rank of Air Marshal. He replaced Air Chief Marshal Sumangala Dias who retired.

Personal life 
Pathiran is married to Mrs. Charmini Pathirana and the couple is blessed with a daughter and a son.

References 

1965 births
Living people
Sri Lanka Air Force air marshals
Sri Lankan expatriates in Pakistan
Sinhalese military personnel
Alumni of Dharmaraja College
Alumni of General Sir John Kotelawala Defence University
University of Madras alumni
Air University (United States Air Force) alumni
Sri Lankan aviators
National Defence College, India alumni